The Poet II  is the fourteenth studio album by American musician Bobby Womack. The album was released in 1984, by Beverly Glen Music. The album features three duets with fellow soul legend Patti LaBelle, including the top three R&B charted ballad, "Love Has Finally Come At Last", and the more modest follow-up, "It Takes a Lot of Strength to Say Goodbye". It also includes the top 75 UK dance hit, "Tell Me Why". The UK music magazine NME named it the best album of 1984.

Track listing

"American Dream" contains an excerpt from Martin Luther King Jr.'s 1963 speech "I Have a Dream"

Personnel
Bobby Womack – vocals, lead guitar, rhythm guitar, arrangements
Patti LaBelle – vocals
Courtney Sappington, David T. Walker, George Benson, Robert Palmer – guitar
David Shields – bass
Michael Wycoff – keyboards
Denzil "Broadway" Miller, Frank "Rusty" Hamilton – synthesizer
James E. Gadson – drums
Fred Johnson – electronic drums
Paulinho da Costa – percussion
Frank "Rusty" Hamilton - harmonica 
Fernando Harkless, Fred Wesley, Harry Kim, Sidney Muldrow, Thurman Green, Wilton Felder – horns
Dorothy Ashby – harp
James Gadson, Kathy Bloxson, Regina Womack, The Valentinos, Luther Waters, Julia Waters, Oren Waters, Maxine Waters – background vocals
David Blumberg – string arrangements
Technical
Otis Smith – executive producer
Barney Perkins - mix engineer

References

1984 albums
Bobby Womack albums
Albums produced by Andrew Loog Oldham
Albums produced by Bobby Womack